Sabuwa (or Sabua) is a Local Government Area in Katsina State, Nigeria. Its headqui are in the town of Sabuwa in the south of the area near sabuwa new market, on the border with Kaduna State at.

It has an area of 642 km and a population of 136,050 at the 2006 census.

The postal code of the area is 830.

The representative to the House of Representatives for the Faskari/Kankara/Sabuwa constituency is mai nauyi.

References

Local Government Areas in Katsina State